Liu Jun, courtesy name Ting Wei (廷偉), was a Chinese landscape and human figure painter in the early Ming Dynasty. His birth and death years are not known.

References

Notes
 Zhongguo gu dai shu hua jian ding zu (中国古代书画鑑定组). 2000. Zhongguo hui hua quan ji (中国绘画全集). Zhongguo mei shu fen lei quan ji. Beijing: Wen wu chu ban she. Volume 10.

Ming dynasty landscape painters
Year of birth unknown
Year of death unknown

https://collectionapi.metmuseum.org/api/collection/v1/iiif/39552/146630/main-image